The House of Mystery (French:La maison du mystère) is a 1933 French crime film directed by Gaston Roudès and starring Jacques Varennes, Blanche Montel and Rolla Norman. It is a remake of the 1923 silent film The House of Mystery.

Cast
 Jacques Varennes as Henri Corradin  
 Blanche Montel as Régine Villandrit  
 Rolla Norman as Julien Villandrit  
 Alice Beylat as La générale  
 Antoine Balpêtré as Rudeberg  
 Monique Povel as La petite Christiane  
 Georges Mauloy as Marjory 
 Jacques Berlioz as Le général de Bettigny 
 Henry Houry as Le commissaire  
 Jean Pâqui as Pascal  
 Marcelle Gilda as La femme de chambre 
 Crista Dorra 
 Luzia 
 Blanche Mauloy

References

Bibliography 
 Crisp, Colin. Genre, Myth and Convention in the French Cinema, 1929-1939. Indiana University Press, 2002.

External links 
 

1933 films
1930s French-language films
Films directed by Gaston Roudès
Remakes of French films
Sound film remakes of silent films
French black-and-white films
French crime films
1933 crime films
1930s French films